On the Spot is an American television sketch comedy series which aired during early 2003 on The WB. The show consisted of a mixture of scripted sketches and improvisational comedy.

Format
The show was based in a Malibu hotel called The Sunspot with various colorful characters. The show constantly played the improvisation game "New Choice" in which a bell would ring and the actor speaking would have to change the line they just finished.

Cast
Charles Esten as himself/host
Jeff B. Davis as Jeff Miller
Erinn Hayes as Brenda
Jordan Black as Monty the Bartender
Arden Myrin as Caramel the Maid
Mindy Sterling as Fifi
Michael Hitchcock as The Professor
Tim Conway as Mr. Henderson
Lance Barber as various characters 
Lindsey Stoddart as various characters
Dweezil Zappa as band leader

Episodes
Pilot (March 20, 2003)
Little Brenda Dynamite (March 27, 2003)
Bachelorette Party (April 3, 2003)
Hooker Convention (April 10, 2003)
One-Star Hotel (April 17, 2003)

External links
 

Television series by Warner Bros. Television Studios
2003 American television series debuts
2003 American television series endings
Television shows set in Malibu, California
2000s American sketch comedy television series
The WB original programming